Tim Hayes may refer to:

 Tim Hayes (Black Panther Party) (born 1950), founder of the Atlanta chapter of the Black Panther Party
 Tim F. Hayes (born 1944), Irish Gaelic footballer